London Love is a 1926 British silent drama film directed by H. Manning Haynes and starring Fay Compton, John Stuart and Miles Mander. It was an adaptation of the novel Whirlpool by Arthur Applin. The screenplay concerns a young woman who becomes a film star in order to raise enough money to pay for her boyfriend's legal defence in a murder trial.

Cast
 Fay Compton - Sally Hope 
 John Stuart - Harry Raymond 
 Miles Mander - Sir James Daring 
 Moore Marriott - Aaron Levinsky 
 A.B. Imeson - Henry Worlock 
 Humberston Wright - Sir Philip Brown 
 Leal Douglas - Mrs. Hope 
 Arthur Walcott - Bersault 
 Grace Vicat - Mrs. James 
 Laura Walker - Anna

References

External links

1926 films
1926 drama films
Films directed by H. Manning Haynes
British drama films
British silent feature films
British black-and-white films
1920s English-language films
1920s British films
Silent drama films